Matias Gunnar Malmberg (born 31 August 2000) is a Danish road and track cyclist, who currently rides for UCI Continental team .

He competed at the 2019 UEC European Track Championships.

Major results

Track
2016
 1st  Team pursuit, National Track Championships
2018
 3rd  Madison (with Oliver Frederiksen), UCI Junior Track World Championships
 3rd Omnium, National Track Championships
2019
 National Track Championships
1st  Madison (with Lasse Norman Hansen)
2nd Omnium
2020
 1st  Omnium, National Track Championships
2021
 UEC European Track Championships
1st  Team pursuit
3rd  Omnium
 1st  Omnium, UEC European Under-23 Track Championships
 1st  Madison (with Rasmus Pedersen), National Track Championships

Road
2022
 1st  Time trial, National Under-23 Road Championships
 1st Stage 1 (TTT) Kreiz Breizh Elites
 7th Overall Flanders Tomorrow Tour
1st Stage 3a (ITT)

References

External links
 

2000 births
Living people
Danish track cyclists
Danish male cyclists
Sportspeople from Frederiksberg